Erich Ribbeck (born 13 June 1937) is a German former professional football player and manager, best known for coaching in the Bundesliga. In 1988, he won the UEFA Cup as manager of Bayer Leverkusen, the first title in the club's history.

Club career
As a player, Ribbeck had a career spanning most of the 1950s into the early 1960s with SSV 1904 Wuppertal, which has since merged with TSG Vohwinkel to form Wuppertaler SV. He later spent the rest of his career playing for Viktoria Köln. The highest level Ribbeck played was the Oberliga, part of the first tier of Germany which was then split into five regional divisions.

Managerial career

Club
His very first coaching position he held at the age of 30 in 1967–68, when he took Rot-Weiss Essen to the second place in the western division of Germany's Level 2 league and thus to the promotion tournament, where the club ended up losing out against Hertha Berlin.

The next ten years he shared evenly with engagements with Eintracht Frankfurt and 1. FC Kaiserslautern. In the Bundesliga these clubs remained on mediocre levels during his tenure. With Kaiserlautern he reached the German Cup final of 1976, losing 0–2 to Hamburger SV.

He achieved his only trophy when he won the UEFA Cup with Bayer Leverkusen. In the finals, Leverkusen came back from 0–3 away to Espanyol to win the eventual penalty shoot-out at home.

He was also runner-up in the German Championship of 1993 with Bayern Munich.

International
Ribbeck was originally considered as a candidate for the national team manager role after the resignation of Helmut Schön in 1978. Instead, Jupp Derwall was selected and it was not until 20 years later on 9 September 1998 that Ribbeck emerged from retirement to take over the Germany national team when other candidates had declined. At 61, he was the oldest appointee to the job.

Ribbeck's two-year tenure marked the worst period in the modern history of Germany's national side. Ribbeck resigned on 21 June 2000 after a string of disappointing results culminating in a group stage exit from Euro 2000. During that tournament, Ribbeck had rejected calls from Oliver Bierhoff, Oliver Kahn, Jens Nowotny and Mehmet Scholl to drop aging sweeper Lothar Matthäus.  Ribbeck had insisted that Matthäus would earn his 150th cap, while threatening any rebellious national team members with a fine or exclusion from the squad.

His results as Germany's coach were ten wins, six draws, and eight losses, the worst managerial performance of all time for a coach of the Germany national team.

Personal life
Ribbeck shares his residence between Pulheim and Tenerife, Spain.

Managerial statistics

Honours

Manager
Bayer Leverkusen
UEFA Cup: 1987–88

See also
List of UEFA Cup and Europa League winning managers

References

External links

Erich Ribbeck at eintracht-archiv.de

UEFA Cup winning managers
1937 births
Living people
Wuppertaler SV players
German football managers
Germany national football team managers
Borussia Dortmund managers
Rot-Weiss Essen managers
FC Bayern Munich managers
Bayer 04 Leverkusen managers
Eintracht Frankfurt managers
1999 FIFA Confederations Cup managers
UEFA Euro 2000 managers
Bundesliga managers
1. FC Kaiserslautern managers
FC Viktoria Köln players
Sportspeople from Wuppertal
Association football defenders
Footballers from North Rhine-Westphalia
German footballers
West German footballers
West German football managers